Fénery is a commune in the Deux-Sèvres department in the Nouvelle-Aquitaine region in western France.

In 2010, the commune of Fénery joined the Communauté de communes de Parthenay, which was established in 2001 by six other local communes and provides a framework within which local tasks are carried out together. This intercommunality was merged into the Communauté de communes de Parthenay-Gâtine in 2014.

See also
Communes of the Deux-Sèvres department

References

Communes of Deux-Sèvres